Joseph Misrahi (1895 – 1975) was an Egyptian fencer. He competed at the 1924 Summer Olympics in individual épée and 1928 Summer Olympics in both individual and team foil, and team épée.

References

External links
 

1895 births
1975 deaths
Egyptian male épée fencers
Egyptian male foil fencers
Olympic fencers of Egypt
Fencers at the 1924 Summer Olympics
Fencers at the 1928 Summer Olympics
20th-century Egyptian people